The Rdum tal-Madonna Important Bird Area comprises a 4 ha linear strip of cliffed coastline about 200 m long near L-AħraxMellieħa, Malta. Its rugged cliffs rise from sea level, where there is much rock debris, to a height of 25 m. It was identified as an Important Bird Area (IBA) by BirdLife International because it supports 500 breeding pairs of yelkouan shearwaters.

See also
 List of birds of Malta

References

Seabird colonies
Important Bird Areas of Malta
Mellieħa
Cliffs of Malta